Annemarie Lütkes (born 24 June 1948 in Bergisch Gladbach) is a German Politician and member of The Greens. From 2000 to 2005 she served as Deputy Minister-President of Schleswig-Holstein and as Schleswig-Holstein Minister of Justice, Women, Youth and Family.

Career 
Lütkes studied at the University of Cologne and is a Lawyer.

She was a member of the Cologne City Council from 1989 to 2000.

In 2000, Lütkes was appointed Schleswig-Holstein Minister of Justice, Women, Youth and Family by Heide Simonis and became Deputy Minister president. She held both offices until the formation of the First Carstensen Cabinet in 2005. Lütkes stayed in Schleswig-Holstein State Politics and became a Member of the Landtag in 2006, as well as her party's Floor Leader.

In 2007, Lütkes went back to North Rhine-Westphalia and became District President of Düsseldorf.

She retired in 2017.

References 

Ministers of the Schleswig-Holstein State Government
Members of the Landtag of Schleswig-Holstein
Alliance 90/The Greens politicians
Politicians from North Rhine-Westphalia
1948 births
Living people